Ulutau is a range of mountains in Kazakhstan. Administratively the range is part of the Ulytau District, Karaganda region.

Geography 
The Ulutau is one of the subranges of the Kazakh Upland system. The mountains are rocky, deeply dissected by ravines and have an arid look.

Rivers Uly-Zhylanshyk, Terisaqqan, Zhymyky, Baikonyr and Kalmakkyrgan (Bileuty) have their sources in the range.

Flora
Steppe vegetation, including grasses, Artemisia and Ephedra grows in rock crevices. Shrubs are found on scree slopes.

See also
Geography of Kazakhstan

References

External links

Ұлытау - Visit Kazakhstan
Kazakh Uplands